Paramonacanthus japonicus is a filefish from the Indo-West Pacific. It occasionally makes its way into the aquarium trade. It grows to a size of 12 cm in length.

References

 

Monacanthidae
Fish described in 1809